Arotrophora cherrapunji is a species of moth of the family Tortricidae. It is found in Assam, India.

The wingspan is about 22 mm. The ground colour of forewings is brownish with darker areas. The costal area is dark brown with pale dots. There are several bluish refractive markings found all over the wing. The hindwings are pale brown.

Etymology
The species name refers to Cherrapunji, the type locality.

References

C
Moths of Asia
Endemic fauna of India
Fauna of Assam
Moths described in 2009